Cline v. American Aggregates Corporation, 474 N.E.2d 324 (OH 1984), was a case decided by the Supreme Court of Ohio that first applied the reasonable use doctrine to water use in that state.

Factual background
The defendants operated a quarry, and as part of the process of extracting limestone, underground aquifers were dewatered.  The plaintiffs on the neighboring land alleged that this dewatered and polluted their wells.  The trial court granted summary judgment to the defendants on the authority of Frazier v. Brown, which allowed a landowner absolute use of the water on their land despite ramifications for neighboring landowners.

Opinion of the Court

Majority opinion
The Supreme Court of Ohio rejected the absolute use rule in Frazier in favor of a reasonable use doctrine that allowed water use as long as it did not unreasonably harm neighbors that also had a right to the water.  The court cited scientific advancements that allowed for better monitoring of water that could more easily determine how much water each landowner was entitled to.  The reasonable use doctrine was adopted from § 858 of the Restatement of Torts, Second, which stated the following standard:

Holmes' concurrence
Justice Holmes wrote separately to emphasize how the reasonable use doctrine provided flexible standards well suited to addressing modern problems associated with water usage.

Subsequent history
The case was remanded to the Court of Appeals of Ohio, which affirmed the decision of the Supreme Court.  An appeal from that ruling was dismissed by the Ohio Supreme Court.

Impact
The reasonable use doctrine adopted in Cline has been codified in Ohio Revised Code § 1521.17.

References

External links
Text of opinion from Google Scholar
Text of Ohio Revised Code § 1521.17

1984 in the environment
1984 in United States case law
United States water case law
Ohio state case law
1984 in Ohio